Oswaldo Johvani Ibarra Carabali (born 8 September 1969) is a former Ecuadorian footballer who played as a goalkeeper.

Club career
Ibarra has spent the majority of his club career playing for El Nacional in Quito.

International career
He also played for the Ecuador national football team and was a participant at the 2002 FIFA World Cup.

Honours

Clubs
 El Nacional
 Ecuadorian Serie A: 1992, 1996, 2005 (Clausura), 2006
 Deportivo Quito
 Ecuadorian Serie A: 2008, 2009

Nation
 
 Canada Cup: 1999

External links

1969 births
Living people
People from Ibarra Canton
Association football goalkeepers
Ecuadorian footballers
C.D. El Nacional footballers
C.D. Olmedo footballers
S.D. Quito footballers
Ecuador international footballers
1997 Copa América players
1999 Copa América players
2001 Copa América players
2002 CONCACAF Gold Cup players
2002 FIFA World Cup players
2004 Copa América players